Amischotolype is a genus of perennial monocotyledonous flowering plants in the Commelinaceae. It is found in Central Africa and from India through Southeast Asia to New Guinea, with the great majority or species found in Asia.

The name is derived from the Ancient Greek words αμισχος, meaning 'unstalked', and τολυπη, meaning 'tangle'. The genus is characterised by its rather compact inflorescences which are composed on two or more cincinni that pierce through the base of the leaf sheath, and also by its seeds that are embedded in red arils. Flowers are actinomorphic, and anthers release their pollen either through a pore at the tip or slits down the sides. They are typically encountered in forest understories. 
The closely related genus Porandra, which consists of three Asian species, is considered by Robert Faden, a leading authority on the family, to be "doubtfully distinct" from Amischotolype. Analysis of DNA sequences has shown that Amischotolype is most closely related to the genus Coleotrype, while these two are in turn most closely related to the genus Cyanotis plus its very close relative Belosynapsis. These four genera form a clade that is found only in the Old World, while all of its immediate ancestors are present only in the New World.

 Species
 Amischotolype barbarossa Duist. - Myanmar, Thailand, Sumatra
 Amischotolype divaricata Duist. - Indochina, Sumatra
 Amischotolype dolichandra Duist. - Assam
 Amischotolype glabrata Hassk. - Himalayas, southern China, Tibet, Indochina, Andaman & Nicobar Islands, western Indonesia
 Amischotolype gracilis (Ridl.) I.M.Turner - Borneo, Malaya, Sumatra
 Amischotolype griffithii (C.B.Clarke) I.M.Turner - Malaya, Riau Islands
 Amischotolype hirsuta (Hallier f.) Duist. - Borneo, Sumatra
 Amischotolype hispida (A.Rich.) D.Y.Hong - Borneo, Sulawesi, Philippines, Maluku, New Guinea
 Amischotolype hookeri (Hassk.) H.Hara - Nepal, Bangladesh, Assam, Bhutan, Arunachal Pradesh
 Amischotolype irritans (Ridl.) I.M.Turner - Thailand, Sumatra, Malaya
 Amischotolype laxiflora (Merr.) Faden - Borneo, Sulawesi
 Amischotolype leiocarpa (Hallier f.) Duist. - Borneo
 Amischotolype lobata Duist. - Borneo
 Amischotolype marginata (Blume) Hassk - Myanmar, Thailand, Malaysia, Indonesia, Philippines
 Amischotolype mollissima (Blume) Hassk - Java, Sumatra
 Amischotolype monosperma (C.B.Clarke) I.M.Turner - Myanmar, Thailand, Malaysia, Borneo
 Amischotolype parvifructa Duist. - Cameron Highlands of Malaysia
 Amischotolype pedicellata Duist. - Borneo
 Amischotolype rostrata (Hassk.) Duist. - Java, Sumatra, Maluku
 Amischotolype sphagnorrhiza Cowley - Brunei, Sarawak
 Amischotolype strigosa Duist. - Sumatra
 Amischotolype tenuis (C.B.Clarke) R.S.Rao - Nigeria, Cameroon, Gabon, Congo-Brazzaville, Equatorial Guinea, Central African Republic, Zaire  
 Amischotolype welzeniana Duist. - Myanmar, Thailand

References

Commelinaceae
Commelinales genera